The Longues-sur-Mer battery (in German: Marineküstenbatterie (MKB) Longues-sur-Mer) was a World War II German artillery battery constructed near the French village of Longues-sur-Mer in Normandy. The battery was sited on a  cliff overlooking the sea and formed a part of Germany's Atlantic Wall coastal fortifications. It was located between the Allied landing beaches of Gold and Omaha and shelled both beaches on D-Day (6 June 1944). The battery was captured on June 7 and played no further part in the Normandy campaign.

The battery is the only one in Normandy to retain all its original guns in situ. It was listed an historical monument in October 2001, and remains in a good state of conservation.

Construction
Construction of the battery - code-named Widerstandsnest (Wn) 48 - began in September 1943 and was completed by April 1944. Although constructed and manned initially by the Kriegsmarine, the battery was later transferred to the German army in late 1943. 

The guns were positioned  on a central pivot mount (Mittelpivotlafette - MPL) TL C/36. Behind each gun were rooms containing the shells and charges. 

It was equipped some of the most technically advanced firing control systems available in Normandy. It communicated with each gun battery via an armoured electrical communication system. 

Also situated at the battery were ammunition bunkers and shelters for defending troops. Three 20 mm anti-aircraft guns were placed at the battery with a searchlight. Around the battery was a minefield, barbed wire fences and machine-gun and mortar pits for defence. A Soviet 122 mm K390 cannon was also placed in an open gun pit close to the entrance to the battery.

Garrison
The battery had a garrison of 184 officers and men, under initial Kriegsmarine command were later transferred to the Heer.

Normandy landings

The battery at Longues-sur-Mer was situated between the landing beaches Omaha and Gold. In the build up to D-Day, the battery was attacked by aircraft on several occasions. On the evening of 5/6 June 1944 the battery was attacked by bombers, little damage was inflicted on the casemates, but bombs severed the armoured communication system. A large amount of the bombs dropped hit a nearby village. The fire control post reverted to visual signals to control some of the guns and this affected their accuracy.

The bombing was followed from 05:37 on the morning of the landings by bombardment from the British cruiser Ajax. The battery itself opened fire at 06:05, and at 06.20 targeted the headquarters ship for Gold Beach, HMS Bulolo, which retreated out of range. 

At 08.00 the British cruisers Ajax and Argonaut engaged the battery. By 08.45 no shots were fired by the battery's guns for a time as the Germans undertook repairs. The heaviest damage was caused by the explosion of the ammunition for an anti-aircraft gun, mounted by the Germans on the roof of casemate No.4, which killed several German soldiers.

After effecting repairs the battery's guns once again opened fire towards Omaha Beach. The French cruisers Georges Leygues and Montcalm, assisted by the World War I vintage dreadnought USS Arkansas returned fire on the battery. The return fire knocked out one casemate and damaged two others. The still active fourth gun opened fire intermittently during the afternoon and evening of D-Day but caused little impact on the Allied landings. The battery had fired over 100 shots through the day.  

The crew of the battery (184 men, half of them over 40 years old) surrendered without a fight to advancing British troops of C Company of the 2nd Devonshire Regiment at midday on June 7.

Advanced Landing Ground B-11
Close to the Longues-sur-Mer battery a temporary Advanced Landing Ground (code-named B-11) airstrip was built by the Allies. The airstrip was active between June 21 to September 4, 1944 and used by the 125th Wing of the No. 83 Expeditionary Air Group flying Spitfires, and by the French air ace Pierre Clostermann.

Gallery of bunker photographs

See also
Azeville battery
Crisbecq Battery
Maisy battery
Merville Gun Battery

External links
Photos from Longues-sur-Mer Battery
Guide to visiting Longues-sur-Mer Battery

References

Atlantic Wall
Military history of France during World War II
Military history of Normandy
Fortifications in France
World War II sites in France
Tourist attractions in Calvados (department)
Monuments historiques of Calvados (department)